"Marriage à la Mode" is a 1921 short story by Katherine Mansfield. It was first published in The Sphere on 31 December 1921, and later reprinted in The Garden Party and Other Stories.

Title
The title is a play on the phrase mariage à la mode in French, which means 'fashionable marriage'.

Plot summary
William would usually buy his children sweets because he knows his wife won't let him buy them 'big donkeys and engines', as that would be unseemly. This time he buys fruit instead.

As it is, they have moved from a small house in London to a bigger one in the countryside. It appears Isabel has changed, thanks to the influence of an older, richer friend, and she now considers William dull and bourgeois.  They have a spat about it one evening.

Isabel then picks up William at the train station, and her affected, Bohemian friends are there. Bobby Kane joins them on the way, and Isabel pays for the sweets he bought. They all go bathing except for William and they come back late, loud, and saying bad things about William. Then at dinner they overeat, and tuck in. The next day, William returns to London for work. On the train, he writes a letter to his wife.

While they are out in the garden, Isabel receives the letter and reads it out loud to her friends, who find it hilarious. She then runs to her bedroom and feels ashamed of having read it to them. She comes to the conclusion that she will write to her husband later but for the time being she will go back to her friends.

Characters
 William, the husband
 Isabel, the wife
 Paddy, one of their children
 Johnny, one of their children
 Bill Hunt, a new friend of Isabel
 Dennis Green, a new friend of Isabel
 Moira Morrison, a new friend of Isabel
 Bobby Kane, a new friend of Isabel

Major themes
 Marriage
 Bourgeois

References to other works
 William Shakespeare's A Midsummer Night's Dream is alluded to when Isabel is called 'Titania'.
 Considered to be Katherine Mansfield's homage to Anton Chekhov's "The Grasshopper".  Both short stories share a very similar cast of characters and plot, however Chekhov's story has the husband die before the wife can become aware of her negative behavior.

References to actual history
Vaslav Nijinsky is referred to by one of Isabel's friends.

Literary significance
The text is written in the modernist mode, without a set structure, and with many shifts in the narrative.

Footnotes

External links
Full Text
The Garden Party and Other Stories at the British Library

Modernist short stories
1921 short stories
Short stories by Katherine Mansfield
Works originally published in The Sphere (newspaper)